The Khwaja Fareed University of Engineering and Information Technology (KFUEIT) is a public university located in Rahim Yar Khan, Punjab, Pakistan. It was established in 2014 on the initiative of the then Chief Minister of Punjab Mian Muhammad Shahbaz Sharif. It was named after the famous Sufi poet Khwaja Ghulam Fareed.

Programs
The university offers the following degree programs:

 BS Mechanical Engineering
 BS Civil Engineering
 BS Electrical Engineering
 BS Computer Engineering
 BS Software Engineering
 BS Chemical Engineering
 BS Agricultural Engineering
 BS Computer Science
 BS Information Technology
 BS Data Science
 BS Artificial Intelligence
 BS Physics
 BS Mathematics
 BS Chemistry
 BS English
 BBA
 BS Optometry
 BS Cosmetology & Dermatology
 BS Radiology
 BS Medical Laboratory Technology
 BS Clinical Psychology
 BS Forensic Science
 BS Botany
 BS Zoology
 BS Biochemistry
 BS Biotechnology
 BS Material Science
 BS Environmental Science
 BS Bioinformatics
 BS Food Science & Technology
 BS Human Nutrition & Dietetics
 BS History
 BS International Relations
 BS Media & Communication
 BS Pakistan Studies
 BS Urdu
 BS Physical Education
 BS Political Science
 BS Fine Arts
 BS Economics
 BS Telecommunication System
 BS Public Administration
 B.Ed.
 MBA Executive
 MSc Chemistry
 MSc Physics
 MSc Computer Science
 MSc Mathematics
 MS Engineering Management
 MS Chemical Engineering
 MS Computer Science
 MS Information Technology
 MS Chemistry
 MS Mathematics
 MS Software Engineering

See also
 List of universities in Pakistan
 List of engineering universities and colleges in Pakistan

References

External links
 KFUEIT official website

Public universities and colleges in Punjab, Pakistan
2014 establishments in Pakistan
Educational institutions established in 2014
Universities and colleges in Rahim Yar Khan
Rahim Yar Khan District
Engineering universities and colleges in Pakistan